The 1967 New South Wales Road Racing Championship was a motor race staged at the Mount Panorama Circuit near Bathurst in New South Wales, Australia on 27 March 1967. The race was contested over 13 laps at a total distance of approximately 50 miles.

The race was won by Kevin Bartlett driving a Brabham BT11A Climax.

Results

References

New South Wales Road Racing Championship
Motorsport in Bathurst, New South Wales